The Maine House of Representatives is the lower house of the Maine Legislature. The House consists of 151 voting members and three nonvoting members. The voting members represent an equal number of districts across the state and are elected via plurality voting. The nonvoting members represent three of Maine's Native American tribes, though two tribes have declined to send representatives. Each voting member of the House represents around 9,000 citizens of the state. Because it is a part-time position, members of the Maine House of Representatives usually have outside employment as well. Members are limited to four consecutive terms of two years each, but may run again after two years.

The House meets at the Maine State House in Augusta.

Leadership of the House
The Speaker of the House presides over the House of Representatives. The Speaker is elected by the majority party caucus followed by confirmation of the full House through the passage of a House Resolution. In addition to presiding over the body, the Speaker is also the chief leadership position, and controls the flow of legislation and committee assignments. Other House leaders, such as the majority and minority leaders, are elected by their respective party caucuses relative to their party's strength in the chamber.

Composition of the 131st (2022-2024) Maine House of Representatives

Nonvoting members of the House
The three nonvoting members within the House represent the Wabanaki or Dawnland nations of the Penobscot, the Passamaquoddy, and the Maliseet. The special Representatives can sponsor legislation relating specifically to the Tribes or in relation to Tribal - State land claims, as well as co-sponsor any other legislation brought before the House, but do not cast a legislative vote due to their unique tribal status representing their tribal members only. The Penobscot, Passamaquoddy and Maliseet tribal representatives are also entitled to sit as members of joint standing committees during hearings and deliberations, where they do cast votes, which can be very important with respect to specific legislative proposals.

Starting with the second session of the 125th Legislature, the Houlton Band of Maliseets was given a legislative seat in the House of Representatives.  The first elected occupant of the seat is Henry John Bear.  After being sworn in by Governor Paul LePage, Bear stated he would introduce legislation to give the Micmac people of Maine a nonvoting seat.

The Passamaquoddy and Penobscots announced at a State House rally on May 26, 2015 that they would withdraw their representatives from the Legislature, citing disputes over tribal fishing rights, jurisdictional issues, and a lack of respect for tribal sovereignty. They further cited an executive order by Governor Paul LePage that rescinded a prior order requiring consultation with the tribes on state issues that affected them as a reason for their decision. Subsequently, Matthew Dana II of the Passamaquoddy and Wayne Mitchell of the Penobscot left the legislature leaving Henry John Bear of the Maliseet the only non-voting tribal representative. In response, Speaker Eves said that the tribal representatives are always welcome in the House. Matthew Dana II returned to the House from the Passamaquoddy Tribe in the 2016 elections.

The Maliseets chose not to send a Representative to the 129th Legislature, elected in 2018. As of December 2022, the Maliseets and the Penobscots haven't returned to the House, leaving just the Passamaquoddy Representative, presently Aaron Dana.

Independents and other parties
Due to the independent political tradition in the state, the Maine House of Representatives has been an entry ground for several of the state's prominent Independent politicians. From 2002 to 2006, Representative John Eder of Portland (District 118), belonging to the Maine Green Independent Party, served in the Legislature, the highest elected Green politician in U.S. politics at that time. Eder secured recognition as a one-member Green Party caucus in the House, receiving a dedicated staff person, which is unusual for individual legislators in the Maine House. In the 2006 elections, Eder lost his seat to a Democratic challenger.

On September 21, 2017, Ralph Chapman, previously registered as an independent, switched his registration to the Maine Green Independent Party, the first time in over a decade that the Maine Green Independent Party was represented at the state level.

Officers

Members of the Maine House of Representatives
Districts are currently numbered starting with 1 from north to south. This is often reversed after each decennial redistricting, and it was reversed in the redistricting which occurred in 2021 and which went into effect beginning with the 2022 primary and general elections. The previous district lines, which were drawn in 2013 and were first used in the 2014 primary and general elections, were only in effect for 8 years rather than the usual 10 as Maine adjusted its legislative redistricting cycle to conform with most other states.

↑ denotes that the Representative first won in a special election

Non-voting members

Past composition of the House of Representatives

See also
 :Category:Members of the Maine House of Representatives
Maine State House
Maine Legislature
Maine Senate
Wabanaki Confederacy

Notes

References

External links
 Maine House of Representatives

Maine Legislature
State lower houses in the United States